Croatia competed at the 2012 Winter Youth Olympics in Innsbruck, Austria. The Croatian team was made up of 9 athletes competing in 6 different sports.

Alpine skiing

Croatia qualified one boy and girl in alpine skiing.

Boy

Girl

Biathlon

Croatia qualified one boy.

Boy

Cross country skiing

Croatia qualified a team of one boy and one girl.

Boy

Girl

Sprint

Ice hockey

Croatia qualified one boy to compete in the skills challenge competition.

Luge

Croatia qualified two girls.

Girls

Snowboarding

Croatia qualified a girl to compete in both halfpipe and slopestyle. However one athlete contested both events.

Girl

See also
Croatia at the 2012 Summer Olympics

References

2012 in Croatian sport
Nations at the 2012 Winter Youth Olympics
Croatia at the Youth Olympics